Detective Chief Inspector Thomas Geoffrey "Tom" Barnaby (born 20 April 1943) is a fictional detective created by English writer Caroline Graham as the protagonist in her Chief Inspector Barnaby novel series and adapted into one of the main characters in the ITV drama Midsomer Murders.

Tom Barnaby (played by John Nettles) first appears in the programme's  first episode The Killings at Badger's Drift and last appears in Fit for Murder, an episode broadcast on 2 February 2011, which is the final episode of the thirteenth series. He states in an episode called Picture of Innocence that his birthday is 20 April 1943. He is married to Joyce Barnaby, played by Jane Wymark and has a daughter called Cully, played by Laura Howard. He appeared in 81 episodes before handing over to his cousin John Barnaby (Neil Dudgeon). He is assisted in every episode by a sergeant. He has three sergeants throughout his tenure, Gavin Troy; 1997–2003, Daniel Scott; 2003–2005 and Benjamin Jones; 2005–2011.

Chief Inspector Barnaby book series
The Killings at Badger's Drift (1987)
Death of a Hollow Man (1989)
Death in Disguise (1992)
Written in Blood (1994)
Faithful unto Death (1996)
A Place of Safety (1999)
A Ghost in the Machine (2004)

Fictional British police detectives
Inspector Barnaby series
Midsomer Murders
Series of books
Television characters introduced in 1987